José Matías Delgado y de León (24 February 1767 – 12 November 1832) was a Salvadoran priest and doctor known as El Padre de la Patria Salvadoreña (The Father of the Salvadoran Fatherland).

He was a prominent leader in the independence movement of El Salvador from the Spanish Empire. From 28 November 1821 to 9 February 1823, he served as the Political Chief of San Salvador and later served as the President of the Constituent Assembly of the United Provinces of Central America from 24 June 1823 to 1 July 1823.

Early years 

José Matías Delgado y de León was born on 24 February 1767 in San Salvador, which was at the time a part of the Spanish Empire administered by the Greater Mayorship of San Salvador (es). His father was Pedro Delgado y Matamoros, a Panamanian who later served as "Ordinary Mayor of First Vote and Alderman and Royal Ensign" of San Salvador in 1797, his mother was Mariana de León Mexía, a Guatemalan, and he had six siblings: Manuel, Miguel, Josefa, Juan, and Francisco, and Mercedes. Through his mother, Delgado was a direct descendant of Sancho de Barahona, a Spanish conquistador who was a companion of Pedro de Alvarado, the conquistador who conquered El Salvador in the 16th century.

Delgado studied jurisprudence and canon law at the University of San Carlos of Guatemala and the Tridentine College and Seminary of Our Lady of the Assumption (es) on a scholarship granted by Cayetano Francos y Monroy (es), the Archbishop of Santiago de Guatemala from 1779 to 1792. He attained the grade of Doctor and was ordained as a priest when he graduated in 1794. In 1808 he began the reconstruction of the old Parochial Church of San Salvador (today El Rosario Church), which was finished a decade later.

Independence movement 

In 1808, Napoleon Bonaparte invaded Spain and deposed King Ferdinand VII, replacing him with Joseph I, Napoleon's brother, beginning the Peninsular War. The Spanish colonies in the Americans did not recognize Joseph I as their King and pro-independence sentiments began arise.

Since 28 June 1805, the Colonial Intendant of San Salvador was Antonio Gutiérrez y Ulloa. He was described as "infatuated" and "difficult" and was unpopular with those residing in San Salvador.

In San Salvador he became a leader of the movement for independence. Together with his nephew Manuel José Arce he was among those who issued the first Cry for Independence in Central America, on 5 November 1811 in San Salvador. On this date he is said to have rung the bells of the Church of La Merced, as a public cry for liberty. The rebellion began with the confiscation of 3,000 guns and the funds in the royal treasury. The provincial intendant, Gutiérrez de Ulloa, was removed, as were most governmental employees.

The rebels held the government for nearly a month before royal authority was restored from Guatemala. Delgado's brothers Juan and Miguel were also members of the independence movement.

In 1813 Delgado was elected a provincial deputy to the council in Guatemala City. He also became director of the Tridentino Seminary there. He was not in El Salvador at the time of the second insurrection in 1814, and did not take part in it.

He was elected provincial deputy again in 1820, and on 15 September 1821, he was among those who signed the Act of Independence of Central America in Guatemala City. On 28 November 1821 he became political chief of the province of San Salvador.

As head of state of El Salvador 

When the Central American governmental junta voted to join the Mexican Empire (5 January 1822), Delgado (and many other Salvadorans) opposed this. On 11 January 1822 in San Salvador, the city government, presided over by Padre Delgado, and many members of the public protested the decision. Also on 11 January, the government of El Salvador seceded from Guatemala in order to remain outside the Mexican Empire.

In April 1822 Colonel Manuel Arzú, in command of Guatemalan troops, occupied the Salvadoran cities of Santa Ana and Sonsonate. On 3 June 1822, Arzú entered San Salvador, reaching the Plaza Major. Nine hours of fighting resulted in many casualties, burned houses and plundering, but the Guatemalans then withdrew. Delgado's nephew, Colonel Manuel José Arce, was one of the commanders of the Salvadoran defenders. On 6 June 1822, Salvadoran troops reoccupied Santa Ana, and later also Ahuachapán and Sonsonate.

On 2 December 1822, fearing further encroachment from Guatemala, El Salvador officially asked for annexation to the United States. A delegation was sent to the United States to negotiate.

That same month, Brigadier Vicente Filísola, Captain General of Guatemala (within the Mexican Empire), marched toward San Salvador. He entered the city on 9 February 1823, declaring respect for people and goods, but also the annexation of the province to Mexico. This was the end of the government of José Matías Delgado.

Later life 
 
On the fall of Mexican Emperor Agustín de Iturbide in 1823, Central America declared its independence. Delgado was elected one of the representatives to the constituent congress of the Federal Republic of Central America. This Congress met in Guatemala beginning on 24 June 1823, and Delgado was chosen to preside.

On 5 May 1824 he was named the first bishop of San Salvador by the local civil authorities and not by the Catholic Church. This entangled him in a serious and long-lasting controversy with the Archbishop of Guatemala and the Vatican authorities that lasted until his death.

In 1824 he bought in Guatemala, with public money, the first official printing press in El Salvador. It was used to publish the first Salvadoran newspaper, El Semanario Político Mercantil. The first issue appeared on 31 July 1824. Delgado died on 12 November 1832 in San Salvador. As his funeral procession passed the Plaza Mayor, mourners showered his coffin with white rose petals. His remains are interred at El Rosario Church.

Legacy 

On 22 January 1833 the National Assembly declared him Benemérito de la Patria.

The Salvadoran lawyer, educator and journalist Rafael Reyes published the first biographical study of Delgado, in December 1878. Later other Central American intellectuals, including Francisco Gavidia, Carlos Meléndez Chaverri, Ramón López Jiménez, Rodolfo Barón Castro, José Salvador Guandique, and Jorge Lardé y Larín did likewise.

His name was given to the town resulting from the merger of Aculhuaca, Paleca and San Sebastián Texincal on 23 October 1935. Dr. José Matías Delgado University, the foundation of which was announced on 15 September 1977, is today located in Antiguo Cuscatlán, a suburb of San Salvador.

The National Assembly commissioned a portrait in oil for its chamber. It was made into a lithograph in New York by A. Demarest. A marble bust was installed on Avenida Inependencia in San Salvador in 1902. Another statue was donated by the German, Austrian and Swiss residents of the country on 14 September 1913. This statue was located at the Parque Arce, but the 1986 San Salvador earthquake destroyed it. There is also a statue of Delgado at the university named for him.

See also 

 Order of José Matías Delgado
 Dr. José Matías Delgado University

References

Bibliography

External links 

 Short biography
Brief biography
 Brief biography
 Dr. José Matías Delgado University official site

1767 births
1832 deaths
Salvadoran independence activists
Salvadoran Roman Catholic priests
Salvadoran people of Spanish descent
Presidents of El Salvador
Universidad de San Carlos de Guatemala alumni
19th-century Salvadoran people